Robert Clydesdale Park (3 July 1946 – 23 July 2019) was a Scottish footballer.

Career
Park would come up through the Aston Villa youth ranks, signing as a professional with them in 1963.

Park would stay at Villa for 6 years, before moving to Wrexham where he made over 100 appearances for the Welsh club.

After his time at Wrexham, he would spend a season at Peterborough United, a season at Northampton Town and a season at Hartlepool United.

Death
Park died on 23 July 2019 after a battle with cancer.

References

1946 births
2019 deaths
Scottish footballers
English Football League players
Aston Villa F.C. players
Wrexham A.F.C. players
Peterborough United F.C. players
Northampton Town F.C. players
Hartlepool United F.C. players
Footballers from Edinburgh
Association football forwards 
Association football midfielders